Afobaka Airstrip  is an airstrip near Afobaka, a village in the Brokopondo District of Suriname. The airstrip is primarily used for emergency evacuation and gold shipment.

History of the airstrip 
Between 1960 and 1964, the 1913 meter-long Afobaka Dam was built on the Suriname River, creating the Brokopondo Reservoir.

Airlines and destinations 
Airlines serving this airport are:

See also

 List of airports in Suriname
 Transport in Suriname

References

External links
Afobakka Airstrip
OurAirports - Afobakka
OpenStreetMap - Afobaka

Airports in Suriname
Brokopondo District